In statistics, Tschuprow's T is a measure of association between two nominal variables, giving a value between 0 and 1 (inclusive). It is closely related to Cramér's V, coinciding with it for square contingency tables.
It was published by Alexander Tschuprow (alternative spelling: Chuprov) in 1939.

Definition
For an r × c contingency table with r rows and c columns, let  be the proportion of the population in cell  and let
 and 

Then the mean square contingency is given as

 

and Tschuprow's T as

Properties

T equals zero if and only if independence holds in the table, i.e., if and only if . T equals one if and only there is perfect dependence in the table, i.e., if and only if for each i there is only one j such that  and vice versa. Hence, it can only equal 1 for square tables. In this it differs from Cramér's V, which can be equal to 1 for any rectangular table.

Estimation

If we have a multinomial sample of size n, the usual way to estimate T from the data is via the formula

 

where  is the proportion of the sample in cell . This is the empirical value of T. With  the Pearson chi-square statistic, this formula can also be written as

See also
Other measures of correlation for nominal data:
 Cramér's V
 Phi coefficient
 Uncertainty coefficient
 Lambda coefficient

Other related articles:
 Effect size

References 

 Liebetrau, A. (1983). Measures of Association (Quantitative Applications in the Social Sciences). Sage Publications

Summary statistics for contingency tables